Cycloptilum comprehendens, the syncopated scaly cricket, is a species of scaly cricket in the family Mogoplistidae. It is found in North America.

Subspecies
These three subspecies belong to the species Cycloptilum comprehendens:
 Cycloptilum comprehendens comprehendens Hebard, 1929
 Cycloptilum comprehendens fortior Hebard, 1931 (desert syncopated scaly cricket)
 Cycloptilum comprehendens interior Hebard, 1931

References

Crickets
Articles created by Qbugbot
Insects described in 1929